The 1978–79 Yugoslav First Basketball League season was the 35th season of the Yugoslav First Basketball League, the highest professional basketball league in SFR Yugoslavia.

Classification 

The winning roster of Partizan:
  Dragan Kićanović
  Miodrag Marić
  Arsenije Pešić
  Dušan Kerkez
  Boban Petrović
  Dragan Todorić
  Jadran Vujačić
  Milan Medić
  Dražen Dalipagić (did not play any games during the season due to serving his mandatory Yugoslav People's Army stint)
  Milenko Savović
  Milenko Babić
  Boris Beravs
  Goran Knežević
  Miroslav Milojević
  Predrag Bojić

Coach:  Dušan Ivković

Scoring leaders
 Dragan Kićanović (Partizan) - ___ points (33.8ppg)

Qualification in 1979-80 season European competitions 

FIBA European Champions Cup
 Partizan (champions)
 Bosna (title holder)

FIBA Cup Winners' Cup
 Zadar (Cup finalist)

FIBA Korać Cup
 Jugoplastika (2nd)
 Cibona (3rd)
 Borac Čačak (5th)
 Radnički Belgrade (6th)

References

Yugoslav First Basketball League seasons
Yugo
Yugo